Irene Jane Beyerlein (born November 1971) is an American materials scientist who is the Mehrabian Interdisciplinary Endowed Chair at the University of California, Santa Barbara. She is a Fellow of the Materials Research Society.

Early life and education 
Beyerlein was born in Los Alamos, New Mexico. She completed undergraduate studies at Clemson University. After her junior year she realized that she was interested mathematics and materials, and decided to major in mechanical engineering. She moved to Cornell University for graduate studies, where she studied fibrous composites. After earning her doctorate, Beyerlein joined the Los Alamos National Laboratory as an J. R. Oppenheimer Fellow. She spent three years as a research fellow before being appointed to the faculty at the LANL.

Research and career 
Beyerlein worked as a theorist at Los Alamos National Laboratory for several years, where she was co-director of the Energy Frontiers Research Center. In 2016, Beyerlein joined the University of California, Santa Barbara.

Beyerlein's research considers the design of materials that can withstand extreme conditions, including high stress, temperature and strain. She has studied how plastic deformations propagate through materials and how strain localization can give rise to the initiation of slip bands. She is particularly interested in how lightweight materials that can improve fuel economy in aircraft.

Beyerlein is the editor of Scripta Materialia and on the editorial board of Acta Materialia. In 2019, Beyerlein was recognized as a Brimacombe Medalist by The Minerals, Metals & Materials Society for her "groundbreaking work on the plasticity of HCP metals and metal nanocomposites as well as for her commitment to mentorship of the next generation of materials scientists."

To date, Beyerlein has published over 500 academic manuscripts, and has been cited over 20,000 times, resulting in an h-index and i10-index of 82 and 301 respectively.

Awards and honors 
 2012 Los Alamos National Laboratory Fellows' Prize
 2013 International Journal of Plasticity Young Research Award
 2014 Distinguished Mentor Award
 2016 NSF ADVANCE STEM Professor Fellowship
 2018 The Minerals, Metals & Materials Society Distinguished Scientist/Engineering Award
 2018 The Minerals, Metals & Materials Society Brimacombe Medalist
2019 AIME Champion H. Mathewson Award 
 2021 Elected Fellow of the Materials Research Society
 2021 LMD Magnesium Technology Award - Best Poster

Selected publications 
 
 
 
Marcel Risse, Martin Lentz, Christoph Fahrenson, Walter Reimers, Marko Knezevic and Irene J. Beyerlein. Elevated Temperature Effects on the Plastic Anisotropy of an Extruded Mg-4 Wt Pct Li Alloy: Experiments and Polycrystal Modeling. Metallurgical and Materials Transactions A volume 48, pages 446–458 (2017). doi:https://doi.org/10.1007/s11661-016-3780-4

Personal life 
Beyerlein is a road cyclist, and was named Los Alamos, New Mexico State Cycling Champion in 2005 and 2010.

References 

21st-century American women scientists
People from Los Alamos, New Mexico
21st-century women engineers
American women engineers
Engineers from New Mexico
Clemson University alumni
Cornell University alumni
University of California, Santa Barbara faculty
American materials scientists
1971 births
Living people